Verkhneye Moshevo is a rural locality (a selo) in Solikamsky District, Perm Krai, Russia. The population was 168 as of 2010. There are 5 streets.

Geography 
Verkhneye Moshevo is located 26 km northwest of Solikamsk (the district's administrative centre) by road. Zaton is the nearest rural locality.

References 

Rural localities in Solikamsky District